Jacob Bossman is an American politician who represents the 14th district in the Iowa House of Representatives.

Bossman served as a regional director for U.S. Senator Chuck Grassley. He lost to Jim Carlin in the 2016 primary election for the sixth district of the Iowa House. He won a special election to the Iowa House to succeed Carlin on January 16, 2018 after Carlin was elected to the Iowa Senate in a special election the previous year.

Bossman is from Sioux City, Iowa.

References

Living people
Iowa Republicans
People from Sioux City, Iowa
21st-century American politicians
1980 births